Eddyville is an unincorporated community in Redbank Township, Armstrong County, Pennsylvania, United States.

History
A post office called Eddyville was established on May 21, 1857, Turney S. Orr, postmaster, and remained in operation until 1907. Eddyville is described as a small town containing besides a gristmill about a dozen other buildings, and including a blacksmith shop, a store, a boatyard, and a post office. Eddyville appears in the 1876 Atlas of Armstrong County, Pennsylvania.

References

Unincorporated communities in Armstrong County, Pennsylvania
Unincorporated communities in Pennsylvania